All for Science is a 1913 American drama film featuring Harry Carey.

Cast
 Reggie Morris as The Chemist
 Harry Carey as The Young Man
 Joseph McDermott as The Detective
 Lionel Barrymore as In Detective Agency
 Claire McDowell as In Detective Agency
 Charles West as In Restaurant

See also
 List of American films of 1913
 Harry Carey filmography
 Lionel Barrymore filmography

External links

1913 films
1913 short films
American silent short films
American black-and-white films
Films directed by Anthony O'Sullivan
1913 drama films
Silent American drama films
1910s American films